Alfardisworthy is a hamlet in Devon, England, which straddles the border with Cornwall. To the northwest is a reservoir, named Upper Tamar Lake, which provides water for the town of Bude and surrounding areas. To the south is Lower Tamar Lake which was constructed to supply the Bude Canal with water. Alfardisworthy is in the parish of Bradworthy.

References

Hamlets in Devon
Torridge District